Khaneqah-e Khangeh (also Romanized as Khāneqāh-e Khāngeh; also known as Khāneqāh) is a village in Mokriyan-e Gharbi Rural District of the Central District of Mahabad County, West Azerbaijan province, Iran. At the 2006 National Census, its population was 1,832 in 418 households. The following census in 2011 counted 3,357 people in 873 households. The latest census in 2016 showed a population of 4,736 people in 1,322 households; it was the largest village in its rural district.

References 

Mahabad County

Populated places in West Azerbaijan Province

Populated places in Mahabad County